The green sturgeon (Acipenser medirostris) is a species of sturgeon native to the northern Pacific Ocean, from China and Russia to Canada and the United States.

Description 

  
Sturgeons are among the largest and most ancient of ray finned fishes.  They are placed, along with paddlefishes and numerous fossil groups, in the infraclass Chondrostei, which also contains the ancestors of all other bony fishes.  The sturgeons themselves are not ancestral to modern bony fishes but are a highly specialized and successful offshoot of ancestral chondrosteans, retaining such ancestral features as a heterocercal tail, fin structure, jaw structure, and spiracle.  They have replaced a bony skeleton with one of cartilage, and possess a few large bony plates instead of scales.  Sturgeons are highly adapted for preying on bottom animals, which they detect with a row of sensitive barbels on the underside of their snouts.  They protrude their very long and flexible “lips” to suck up food.  Sturgeons are confined to temperate waters of the Northern Hemisphere.  Of 25 extant species, only two live in California, the green sturgeon and the white sturgeon (A. transmontanus).  (Moyle 2002)

Green sturgeon are similar in appearance to white sturgeon, except the barbels are closer to the mouth than to the tip of the long, narrow snout.  The dorsal row of bony plates numbers 8–11, lateral rows, 23–30, and bottom rows, 7–10; there is one large scute behind the dorsal fin as well as behind the anal fin (both lacking in white sturgeon).  The scutes also tend to be sharper and more pointed than in white sturgeon.  The dorsal fin has 33–36 rays, the anal fin, 22–28. The body colour of the white sturgeon is yellow with some pink instead of the green of the green sturgeon.

Protected status 
On April 7, 2006, the National Marine Fisheries Service (NMFS) issued a final rule listing the Southern distinct population segment (DPS) of North American green sturgeon as a threatened species under the United States Endangered Species Act.  Included in the listing is the green sturgeon population spawning in the Sacramento River and living in the Sacramento River, the Sacramento-San Joaquin Delta, and the San Francisco Bay Estuary. This threatened determination was based on the reduction of potential spawning habitat, the severe threats to the single remaining spawning population, the inability to alleviate these threats with the conservation measures in place, and the decrease in observed numbers of juvenile Southern DPS green sturgeon collected in the past two decades compared to those collected historically (NMFS 2006).

Critical habitat for the Southern DPS of green sturgeon was designated under the United States Endangered Species Act on October 9, 2009.

The northern DPS of the green sturgeon (which spawn in the Rogue River, Klamath River, and Umpqua River) is a U.S. National Marine Fisheries Service Species of Concern.  Species of Concern are those species about which the U.S. Government's National Oceanic and Atmospheric Administration, National Marine Fisheries Service, has some concerns regarding status and threats, but for which insufficient information is available to indicate a need to list the species under the U.S. Endangered Species Act.

Life history and habitat requirements 

Sturgeons life history strategy seems organized around reducing risks.  Sturgeons live a long time, delay maturation to large sizes, and spawn multiple times over their lifespan.  The sturgeon's long life span and repeat spawning in multiple years allows them to outlive periodic droughts and environmental catastrophes.  The high fecundity that comes with large size allows them to produce large numbers of offspring when suitable spawning conditions occur and to make up for years of poor conditions.  Adult green sturgeon do not spawn every year, and only a fraction of the population enters freshwater where they risk greater exposure to catastrophic events.  The widespread ocean distribution of green sturgeon ensures that most of the population is dispersed and less vulnerable than they are in estuaries and freshwater streams.

The ecology and life history of green sturgeon have received little study, evidently because of the generally low abundance, limited spawning distribution, and low commercial and sport fishing value of the species (Moyle 2002).  Green sturgeon enters  rivers mainly to spawn. and is more marine than other sturgeon species (Moyle 2002).

The United States Fish and Wildlife Service (USFWS) reported in 1995 that for the Klamath River, green sturgeon life history could be divided into three phases: 1) freshwater juveniles (< 3 years old); 2) coastal migrants (3–13 years old for females and 3–9 years for males); and 3) adults (>13 years old for females and > 9 years old for males).

Northern DPS green sturgeon migrate up the Klamath River between late February and late July (Moyle 2002). The spawning period is March–July, with a peak from mid-April to mid-June (Moyle 2002). Spawning takes place in deep, fast water (Moyle 2002). Preferred spawning substrate is likely large cobble, but it can range from clean sand to bedrock (Moyle 2002). Eggs are broadcast and externally fertilized in relatively fast water and probably in depths greater than 3 m (Moyle 2002).

Temperatures of  affected cleavage and gastrulation of green sturgeon embryos and all died before hatch (Van Eenennaam et al. 2005). The mean total length of hatched green sturgeon embryos decreased with increasing temperature, although their wet and dry weight remained relatively constant (Van Eenennaam et al. 2005). Van Eenennaam et al. 2005 concluded that temperatures  may be the upper limit of the thermal optima for green sturgeon embryos. Growth studies on younger juvenile green sturgeon determined that cyclical  water temperature was optimal (Allen et al. 2006).

Green sturgeon fertilization and hatching rates are 41.2% and 28.0%, compared with 95.4% and 82.1% for the white sturgeon (Deng et al. 2002). However, the survival of green sturgeon larvae is very high (93.3%) (Deng et al. 2002). Female green sturgeon invest a greater amount of their reproductive resources into maternal yolk for nourishment of the embryo, which results in larger larvae (Van Eenennaam et al. 2001). Five-day-old green sturgeon larvae have almost twice the weight of white sturgeon larvae ( versus ) (Van Eenennaam et al. 2001). This greater reserve of maternal yolk and larger larvae could provide an advantage in larval feeding and survival (Van Eenennaam et al. 2001). Compared with other acipenserids, green sturgeon larvae appear more robust and easier to rear (Van Eenennaam et al. 2001). Juveniles continue to grow rapidly, reaching  in 1 year and over  within 2–3 years for the Klamath River (USFWS 1995).

A conceptual model of early behavior and migration of green sturgeon early life intervals based on the Kynard et al. 2005 study follows:  Females deposit eggs at sites with large rocks and moderate or eddy water flow that keeps the large, dense, poorly adhesive eggs from drifting, so eggs sink deep within the rocks. CH2M Hill (2002) assumed that hatchling green sturgeon embryos drift downstream like hatchling white sturgeon embryos. This was incorrect. Hatchling green sturgeon embryos seek nearby cover, and remain under rocks, unlike white sturgeon which drift downstream as embryos (i.e. newly hatched green sturgeon do not exhibit pelagic behavior like newly hatched white sturgeon) (Deng et al. 2002). After about 9 days fish develop into larvae and initiate exogenous foraging up- and downstream on the bottom (they do not swim up into the water column, unlike white sturgeon). After a day or so, larvae initiate a downstream dispersion migration that lasts about 12 days (peak, 5 days). All migration and foraging during the migration period is nocturnal, unlike white sturgeon. During the first 10 months of life, green sturgeon are the most nocturnal of any North American sturgeon yet studied, and this was the case for all life intervals during any activity (migration, foraging, or wintering). Post-migrant larvae are benthic, foraging up- and downstream diurnally with a nocturnal activity peak. Foraging larvae select open habitat, not structure habitat, but continue to use cover in the day. When larvae develop into juveniles, there is no change in response to bright habitat, and no preference or avoidance of bright habitat. During winter, juveniles select low light habitat, likely deep pools with some rock structure. Wintering juveniles forage actively at night between dusk and dawn and are inactive during the day, seeking the darkest available habitat.

The largest green sturgeon have been aged at 42 years, but this is probably an underestimate, and maximum ages of 60–70 years or more are likely (Moyle 2002).

Little is known about green sturgeon feeding at sea, but it is clear they behave quite differently than white sturgeon (CDFG 2005a).  Green sturgeons are probably found in all open Oregon estuaries, with a lot of movement in and out of estuaries and up and down the coast (ODFW 2005a).  Adults feed in estuaries during the summer (ODFW 2005a).  Stomachs of green sturgeons caught in Suisun Bay contained Corophium sp. (amphipod), Crago franciscorum (bay shrimp), Neomysis awatchensis (Opossum shrimp) and annelid worms (Ganssle 1966).  Stomachs of green sturgeon caught in San Pablo Bay contained Crago franciscorum (bay shrimp), Macoma sp. (clam), Photis californica (amphipod), Corophium sp. (amphipod), Synidotea laticauda (isopod), and unidentified crab and fish (Ganssle 1966).  Stomachs of green sturgeons caught in Delta contained Corophium sp. (amphipod), Neomysis awatchensis (Opossum shrimp) (Radtke 1966).  Radtke 1966 also reported that while the Asiatic clam (Corbicula fluminea) was abundant throughout the Delta, Suisun Bay and San Pablo Bay, it was not utilized as a food source by green sturgeons.

Conservation

Threats to the green sturgeon include being taken as bycatch in salmon gillnet and other fisheries, water development projects that affect migration or decrease habitat quality, and other land use stressors that affect habitat quality. Exotic species may negatively affect the southern DPS.  Commercial fisheries have been prohibited in the Columbia River and Willapa Bay since 2001.  Harvest of green sturgeon in California has been prohibited since March 2007.  Beginning in March 2010 and to protect green sturgeon on their spawning grounds, the Sacramento River sturgeon fishery was closed year-round between the Keswick Dam and Hwy 162 bridge (approximately ).

Current and historical distribution 

The green sturgeon is the most widely distributed member of the sturgeon family Acipenseridae, and is also the most marine-oriented of the sturgeon species.  Green sturgeon are known to range in nearshore marine waters from Mexico to the Bering Sea, with a general tendency to head North after their out-migration from freshwater (NMFS 2005).  They are commonly observed in bays and estuaries along the western coast of North America, with particularly large concentrations entering the Columbia River estuary, Willapa Bay, and Grays Harbor during the late summer (Moyle 2002, NMFS 2005).  While there is some bias associated with recovery of tagged fish through commercial fishing, the pattern of a northern migration is supported by the large concentration of green sturgeon in the Columbia River estuary, Willapa Bay, and Grays Harbor, which peaks in August (NMFS 2005).

Prehistoric fish distributions have been mapped by Gobalet et al. 2004 based on bones at Native American archaeological sites. Data were reported on dozens of sites throughout California and summarized by county.  Sturgeon remains were observed in 12 counties, all in the Central Valley.  Observations were concentrated at San Francisco Bay and Sacramento-San Joaquin and delta sites (Contra Costa, Alameda, San Francisco, Marin, Napa, San Mateo and Santa Cruz counties).  Historical 18th-century accounts report the aboriginal gillnetting and use of tule balsa watercraft for the capture of sturgeon, and fishing weirs were also likely employed on bay tidal flats (Gobalet et al. 2004).  Most sturgeons were unidentified species but green sturgeons were specifically identified from Contra Costa and Marin County sites.  Sturgeon remains (unidentified species) were also identified from lower Sacramento River counties (Sacramento, Yolo, Colusa, Glenn, and Butte counties).  No sturgeon remains were found in samples from the upper Sacramento River although other fish species including salmonids were reported in those areas.

Green sturgeons which spawn in the Rogue River, Klamath River, and Umpqua River are the Northern DPS green sturgeon, while the green sturgeons which spawn in the Sacramento River system are Southern DPS green sturgeon (NMFS 2005).  Both the Northern DPS green sturgeon and Southern DPS green sturgeon occur in large numbers in the Columbia River estuary, Willapa Bay, and Grays Harbor, Washington (NMFS 2005).

A number of presumed spawning populations (Eel River and South Fork Trinity River) have been lost in the past 25–30 years (Moyle 2002).  Moyle 1976 reported green sturgeon spawning in the Mad River, but does not mention the Mad River in 2002.  Scott and Crossman 1973 reported potential spawning in the Fraser River in Canada, but Moyle 2002 reported that there was no evidence of green sturgeon spawning in Canada or Alaska.  Green and white sturgeon enter the Feather River system annually and spawning of green sturgeon was documented for the first time in 2011(Seesholtz et al. 2014). No current use by sturgeon of Sacramento River tributaries, other than the Feather River system, has been reported (Beamesderfer et al. 2004, Moyle 2002).  No evidence was found to indicate that green sturgeons were historically present, are currently present, or were historically present and have been extirpated from the San Joaquin River upstream from the Delta (Beamesderfer et al. 2004). There is no evidence of green sturgeon spawning in the Columbia River or other rivers in Washington (Moyle 2002, ODFW 2005a and 2005b).  In contrast to those studies, samples from green sturgeon collected in the Columbia River suggest the existence of one or more spawning populations in addition to the Sacramento system, Klamath, and Rogue populations, suggesting not all spawning populations have been identified (Israel et al. 2004).

Individual Southern DPS green sturgeon tagged by the California Department of Fish and Game (CDFG) in the San Francisco Estuary have been recaptured off Santa Cruz, California; in Winchester Bay on the southern Oregon coast; at the mouth of the Columbia River; and in Gray's Harbor, Washington  (USFWS 1993 and Moyle 2002).  Most tags for Southern DPS green sturgeon tagged in the San Francisco Estuary have been returned from outside that estuary (Moyle 2002).  Green sturgeons remain present in all documented historic habitats and ranges in Oregon (ODFW 2005b).

White and green sturgeon juveniles, subadults, and adults are widely distributed in the Sacramento-San Joaquin Delta and estuary areas including San Pablo (Beamesderfer et al. 2004).  White sturgeon historically ranged into upper portions of the Sacramento system including the Pit River and a substantial number were trapped in and above Lake Shasta when Shasta Dam was closed in 1944 and successfully reproduced until the early 1960s (Beamesderfer et al. 2004).  Landlocked white sturgeon populations have been widely observed in the Columbia and Fraser systems but no landlocked green sturgeon populations have ever been documented in any river system (Beamesderfer et al. 2004), indicating that green sturgeon likely did not historically spawn in the upper reaches of rivers prior to the construction of large dams as NMFS 2005 has assumed.

Taxonomy
According to recent genetic data, the differences between the mitogenomes of the Green sturgeon (Acipenser medirostris) and the Sakhalin sturgeon (Acipenser mikadoi) to correspond to the variability at the intraspecific level. The time since the divergence of the Green sturgeon and the Sakhalin sturgeon may be approximately 160,000 years.

References

Further reading

 
 Allen, P. J., M. Nicholl, S. Cole, A. Vlazny, and J.J. Cech Jr.  2006.  Growth of Larval to Juvenile Green Sturgeon in Elevated Temperature Regimes.  Transactions of the American Fisheries Society 135:89–96.
 Beamesderfer, R., M. Simpson, G. Kopp, J. Inman, A. Fuller and D. Demko.  2004.  Historical and Current Information on Green Sturgeon Occurrence in the Sacramento and San Joaquin Rivers and Tributaries.  S.P. Cramer and Associates, Inc.  46 p.
 California Department of Fish and Game.  2005.  White Sturgeon Population Estimate.  Email from Marty Gingras, Senior Biologist Supervisor, California Department of Fish and Game.  1 p.
 CH2M Hill, Inc.  2002.  Environmental Impact Statement/Environmental Impact Report for Fish Passage Improvement Project at the Red Bluff Diversion Dam.  Prepared by CH2MHill, Inc. for the Tehama-Colusa Canal Authority and the U.S. Bureau of Reclamation.
 Deng, X., J.P. Van Eenennaam, and S.I. Doroshov.  2002.  Comparison of Early Life Stages and Growth of Green and White Sturgeon.  American Fisheries Society Symposium 28:237–248.
 Gobalet, K.W., P.D. Schultz, T.A. Wake, and N. Siefkin.  2004.  Archaeological perspectives on Native American fisheries of California, with emphasis on steelhead and salmon.  Transactions of the American Fisheries Society 133:801–833.
 Ganssle, D.  1966.  Fishes and Decapods of San Pablo and Suisun Bays.  In: D.W. Kelley (ed.) Ecological Studies of the Sacramento San Joaquin Estuary: Part I; Zooplankton, Zoobenthos, and Fishes of San Pablo and Suisun Bays, Zooplankton and Zoobenthos of the Delta.  California Department of Fish and Game.  Fish Bulletin 133.
 Israel, J.A., J.F. Cordes, M.A. Blumberg and B. May.  2004.  Geographic Patterns of Genetic Differentiation among Collections of Green Sturgeon.  North American Journal of Fisheries Management 24:922–931.
 Kynard, B., E. Parker and T. Parker.  2005.  Behavior of early life intervals of Klamath River green sturgeon, Acipenser medirostris, with a note on body color.  Environmental Biology of Fishes 72:85–97.
 Moyle, P.B.  2002.  Inland Fishes of California.  University of California Press, Berkeley, California.  106–113 p.
 Oregon Department of Fish and Wildlife.  2005a.  Wildfish: Chapter 6.  http://www.dfr.state.or.us/ODFWhtml/Research&Reports/WildFish/Chapter6.html.
 Oregon Department of Fish and Wildlife.  2005b.  Oregon Native Fish Status Report.  Salem, Oregon.  491 p.
 National Marine Fisheries Service.  2005.  Endangered and Threatened Wildlife and Plants:  Proposed Threatened Status for Southern Distinct Population Segment of North American Green Sturgeon.  April 6, 2005.  Federal Register 70(65):17386-17401.
 National Marine Fisheries Service.  2006.  Endangered and Threatened Wildlife and Plants:  Threatened Status for Southern Distinct Population Segment of North American Green Sturgeon.  April 7, 2006.  Federal Register 71(67):17757-17766.
 Seesholtz, A.M., M.J. Manuel, and J.P. Van Eenennaam. 2014. First documented spawning and associated habitat conditions for green sturgeon in the Feather River, California. Environmental Biology of Fishes 97(9)
 Radtke, L.D.  1966.  Distribution of Smelt, Juvenile Sturgeon, and Starry Flounder in the Sacramento San Joaquin Delta with observations on Food of Sturgeon.  In: D.W. Kelley (ed.) Ecological Studies of the Sacramento San Joaquin Estuary: Part II; Fishes of the Delta.  California Department of Fish and Game.  Fish Bulletin 133.
 U.S. Fish and Wildlife Service.  1993.  Framework: For the Management and Conservation of Paddlefish and Sturgeon Species in the United States.  Division of Fish Hatcheries, Washington DC.  40 p.
 U.S. Fish and Wildlife Service.  1995.  Age and Growth of Klamath River Green Sturgeon (Acipenser medirostris).  Klamath River Fishery Resource Office, Yreka, California.  20 p.
 Van Eenennaam, J.P., M.A.H. Webb, X. Deng, and S.I. Doroshov.  2001.  Artificial Spawning and Larval Rearing of Klamath River Green Sturgeon.  Transactions of the American Fisheries Society 130:159–165.
 Van Eenennaam, J.P., J. Linares-Casenave, X. Deng, and S.I. Doroshov.  2005.  Effect of incubation temperature on green sturgeon, Acipenser medirostris.  Environmental Biology of Fishes 72:145–154.
 Van Eenennaam, J.P., J. Linares-Casenave and S.I. Doroshov.  2006.  Reproductive Conditions of the Klamath River Green Sturgeon.  Transactions of the American Fisheries Society 135:151–163.

Fish of North America
Sacramento–San Joaquin River Delta
Articles containing video clips
ESA threatened species
Fish described in 1854
Acipenser